Ramata Daou (born March 23, 1988) is a Malian-born Senegalese basketball player for the Senegalese national team.

She participated at the 2017 Women's Afrobasket.

References

1988 births
Living people
Senegalese women's basketball players
Sportspeople from Bamako
Centers (basketball)
21st-century Malian people